Species 8472 is a fictional extraterrestrial species in the science fiction television series Star Trek: Voyager.  Species 8472 is a designation given to them by the Borg.  The multiplayer game Star Trek Online gives their proper name as Undine.

When the USS Voyager made contact with them, Species 8472 were engaged in a war with one of Star Trek's perennial antagonists, the Borg. They are noted for being a tripedal and telepathic species and for their use of biotechnology. They originated from what is called fluidic space and fought a successful war against the Borg for a time. They made peace with the Federation by negotiations with Captain Kathryn Janeway of the Starfleet vessel USS Voyager in the later 24th century.

Star Trek: Voyager
Relevant episodes of Star Trek: Voyager in which Species 8472 appear include season 3 episode 26 (season finale) "Scorpion: Part 1" and season 4 episode 1 (season premiere) "Scorpion: Part 2", season 4 episode 16 "Prey", and season 5 episode 4 "In the Flesh".

Species 8472 are discovered by the Borg in 2373 when the Borg invade fluidic space ("Scorpion: Part 2") by opening a rift in space using a deflector dish. The Borg discover Species 8472 in the Delta Quadrant and try to assimilate its biotechnology, which is more advanced than anything the Borg have seen. The Borg quickly realize that Species 8472 is immune to assimilation and that contemporary Borg technology is no match for it. In fact, 8472 is one of the few species so advanced that its ships are able to destroy Borg cubes in seconds. Species 8472 invades the Delta Quadrant in retaliation for Borg aggression and begins a systematic extermination of the Borg as well as innocent species. Over the course of five months, tens of billions of drones are lost, as well as several hundred planets and ships. When the crew of Voyager realizes that it has no choice but to go through Borg space to continue home in any kind of timely manner, Captain Kathryn Janeway hatches a plan to construct a weapon, based on a treatment that the Doctor had created, to kill Species 8472 and use it as a bargaining chip with the Borg, in exchange for safe passage through Borg space. The Borg reluctantly accept. In conjunction with Janeway, the Borg develop a high-yield warhead armed with modified nanoprobes, developed by the Doctor, the ship's Emergency Medical Hologram (EMH), from the Borg's own technology, that is effective at killing 8472 and forces them to retreat to fluidic space. In return for Janeway's help, the Borg allow Voyager safe passage through their space for the duration of their cooperative efforts. However, upon Species 8472's retreat from normal space, the Borg terminate the alliance in favor of (unsuccessfully) assimilating Voyager.

A member of Species 8472 is left in the Delta Quadrant during the retreat and is relentlessly hunted by a group of Hirogen for several months.

Concerned about the threat posed by humanity, Species 8472 builds 13 "terraspheres" in the Delta Quadrant and recreates Starfleet Academy within, as a staging ground for an intelligence gathering mission on Earth. The plan is uncovered by Voyager and peace talks commence.  Janeway convinces 8472, led by an individual posing as Boothby, that the United Federation of Planets has no quarrel with them – in fact, the Federation is not even aware of the existence of Species 8472, except for the Voyager crew, and the crew is well aware that the Borg themselves started the war between the two species by invading fluidic space to assimilate the superior technology of Species 8472.

Video games
Species 8472 appear as villains in the video games Star Trek: Voyager – Elite Force and Star Trek: Armada II. They also make an appearance in Star Trek Online, in which they are referred to as the Undine.  In Star Trek: Alien Domain they are the primary antagonists.

Reception
In 2017, ScreenRant ranked the Species 8472 the 11th most bizarre aliens in Star Trek. The Guardian's Vera Rule said that their design reminded them "of HR Gigerish bio-nastiness but with Ray Harryhausen animation".

References
Notes

Bibliography

External links

Star Trek species
Fictional ungulates

de:Völker und Gruppierungen im Star-Trek-Universum#Spezies 8472
sv:Lista över utomjordiska raser i Star Trek#Art 8472